Chloroselas ogadenensis is a butterfly in the family Lycaenidae. It is found in Somalia.

References

Butterflies described in 1966
Chloroselas
Endemic fauna of Somalia
Butterflies of Africa